The UMBC Retrievers men's lacrosse team represents the University of Maryland, Baltimore County (UMBC), in National Collegiate Athletic Association (NCAA) Division I men's college lacrosse competition. The Retrievers play their home games at UMBC Stadium, located in Baltimore, Maryland with a capacity of 4,500 spectators. UMBC competes as a member of the America East Conference. The program has an all-time record of 373–344 including pre-NCAA results.

History
The University of Maryland, Baltimore County was founded in 1966, and athletic director and men's lacrosse coach Dick Watts started the first team in 1968 at the NCAA Division II level.<ref name=miaa>Paul McMullen, UMBC steps up in class Lacrosse: With the help of former Hopkins coach Don Zimmerman and eight MIAA front-line players, the Retrievers are on their way to the Division I tournament for the first time., The Baltimore Sun, May 6, 1998.</ref> The Retrievers advanced to the NCAA Division II championship finals in 1979 and 1980, winning the national title in 1980. In 1981, UMBC promoted its lacrosse team to the Division I level. Watts, however, struggled to build the team in the face of poor facilities and scheduling.

In 1989, newly hired athletic director Charlie Brown began campaigning for upgrades to UMBC Stadium, which finally came to fruition in 1996 with funding of $2.3 million. In 1993, UMBC increased its scholarship allotment from eight to the NCAA maximum of 12.6. That year, Watts resigned as head coach and was replaced by Don Zimmerman, who had previously led Johns Hopkins to three national championships. Early in his tenure at UMBC, Zimmerman and his staff had difficulty recruiting in their targeted region, New York. Of Zimmerman's initial 1994 recruiting class of nine, only two players remained at UMBC for the entirety of their collegiate career. In 1996, an increased strength of schedule led to a 3–9 finish for the Retrievers, which included a school record 27 goals allowed against Towson State. The UMBC staff landed some highly sought after Baltimore area recruits and transfers with the incentive of early playing time, including two Baltimore Sun'' Players of the Year in 1996. In 1997, UMBC improved to a 9–3 record, but missed the tournament because of a relatively weak schedule. The Retrievers entered the 1998 season with a No. 18 preseason ranking, and upset Maryland, 12–8, to clinch an invitation to the school's first NCAA Division I tournament as the No. 8 seed. UMBC returned to the tournament the following year.

Into the 2000s, UMBC continued to grow as a nationally competitive team. The Retrievers won the America East Conference tournaments in 2006, 2008, and 2009, while being eliminated in the final in 2007. In 2007, UMBC upset seventh-seeded Maryland, 13–9, in the first round to advance to the NCAA tournament quarterfinals where they were eliminated by Delaware. The Retrievers finished the 2009 season with a 12–4 record, winning the America East tournament before being eliminated in the first round of the NCAA tournament by North Carolina.

Going into the 2010s, the Retrievers struggled as the Hartford Hawks and Albany Great Danes both rose as America East powers.  During this time, the Retrievers finished with a winning record once, an 8–7 season in 2014.  During this time, numerous players transferred out of the program, most notably Pat Young to Maryland in 2015.   However, they did make the 2013 and 2014 America East Championship games, falling both times.  In 2015, the Retrievers failed to make the conference tournament for the first time since joining the America East, and a similar finish in 2016 resulted in longtime coach Don Zimmerman retiring at the end of the season
.

On June 20, 2016, UMBC hired former Loyola Greyhound assistant Ryan Moran as head coach.

Season Results
The following is a list of UMBC's results by season since the institution of NCAA Division I in 1971:

{| class="wikitable"

|- align="center"

†NCAA canceled 2020 collegiate activities due to the COVID-19 virus.

See also
List of UMBC alumni for a list of notable former players.

References

External links
 

NCAA Division I men's lacrosse teams
UMBC Retrievers men's lacrosse